is a Japanese bank that is headquartered in Sapporo, Hokkaidō.  The Hokkaido Bank is a subsidiary of the Hokuhoku Financial Group as a result of a merger with the Hokuriku Bank on September 1, 2004.  The Hokkaido Bank has 134 domestic branches, with 131 of them in Hokkaidō, and one each in the Tohoku region, Tokyo, and Osaka.

History

The Hokkaido Bank was established on March 5, 1951 in Sapporo.  In 1997, Hokkaido Bank entered into merger talks with the embattled Hokkaido Takushoku Bank.  However, these talks broke off and Hokkaido Takushoku Bank subsequently entered bankruptcy.  On May 24, 2002, Hokkaido Bank and Hokuriku Bank agreed to business tie-ups.  Approximately one year later on May 23, 2003, the banks agreed to merge management.  On September 1, 2004, both banks became subsidiaries of the Hokuhoku Financial Group.

External links
 Hokkaido Bank
 Hokuhoku Financial Group
 Hokuriku Bank

Hokkaido region
Regional banks of Japan